CSX Transportation owns and operates a vast network of rail lines in the United States east of the Mississippi River. In addition to the major systems which merged to form CSX – the Baltimore and Ohio Railroad, Chesapeake and Ohio Railway, Louisville and Nashville Railroad, Atlantic Coast Line Railroad and Seaboard Air Line Railroad – it also owns major lines in the Northeastern United States acquired from the 1998 breakup of Conrail.

The lines are split into two regions – Northern and Southern, further split into divisions (five per region), and finally into subdivisions, most of which consist of a single main line with short branches.

Active lines

Former lines

See also 
 List of Norfolk Southern Railway lines

References 

 CSX Transportation Timetables

 
CSX